Bralon Taplin (born 8 May 1992) is a Grenadian sprinter. He competed in the 400 metres event at the 2015 World Championships in Beijing without advancing from the first round.

He switched his allegiance from the United States to Grenada in December 2012.  Previously he ran for Stony Point High School, winning the Texas state championship in the 400. then spent two years at South Plains College, winning the NJCAA Championship.  He completed his college career at Texas A&M University.

In 2016 he represented Grenada at the Rio Olympics and progressed to the final where he eventually placed 7th with a time of 44.45 seconds.

In 2017 he started his season by participating in the IAAF World Indoor Tour. The first event he would take part in as part of the Tour would be the PSD Bank Meeting, held in Düsseldorf, Germany where he finished first in his group but second overall with a time of 46.25. His second race of the Tour was the Copernicus Cup. He not only finished first overall but he also established a new meet record with a time of 45.59 seconds. The third and deciding race of the Tour was the Müller Indoor Grand Prix which took place in Birmingham, England. In this race Bralon placed fourth with a time of 46.38 seconds. The fourth-place finish meant that Bralon would have missed out on the " Wild Card" entry into the 2018 IAAF World Indoor Championships Birmingham. Aside from the Tour Bralon set a National record in the 300m sprint (indoor) with a time of 31.97 seconds. His time was the fourth fastest indoor 300m time when it was set and was achieved at the Czech Indoor Gala in Ostrava, Czech Republic.

Bralon began his individual 2018 season with a world leading  45.48 indoor at the Ted Nelson Invitational in College Station. At the Charlie Thomas Invitational in College Station, Texas on 3 February, Bralon ran a 44.88 indoor lifetime best over 400m. He became  sixth man in history to better the 45-second barrier for 400m indoors. Bralon's time ranks him fifth on the world indoor all-time list, just two places and 0.08 behind  Kirani James, the 2012 Olympic champion.

Competition record

Personal bests
Outdoor
200 metres – 20.83 (+0.4 m/s, San Angelo 2012)
400 metres – 44.38 (Monaco 2016)
Indoor
200 metres – 20.80 (College Station 2015)
300 metres – 31.97 (Ostrava, Czech Republic 2017)NR
400 metres – 44.88 (College Station, USA 2018)

References

External links
 

1992 births
Living people
Grenadian male sprinters
World Athletics Championships athletes for Grenada
Athletes (track and field) at the 2014 Commonwealth Games
Athletes (track and field) at the 2018 Commonwealth Games
Commonwealth Games competitors for Grenada
Athletes (track and field) at the 2015 Pan American Games
Athletes (track and field) at the 2019 Pan American Games
Pan American Games competitors for Grenada
People from St. George's, Grenada
Athletes (track and field) at the 2016 Summer Olympics
Olympic athletes of Grenada